The Commonwealth Governor's School (CGS) is one of 18 magnet Governor's Schools in Virginia. The Commonwealth Governor's School is a half-day program for gifted and highly motivated students based on a school-within-a-school model. Admissions are competitive (involving an interview, a review of school history and teacher recommendations) and students are selected from Stafford, Spotsylvania, Caroline, and King George counties. Students may attend CGS grades 9 through 12.

Program structure 

Enrolled students take all of their core academic classes at one of the six Governor's School sites. (Spotsylvania High School, Riverbend High School, Colonial Forge High School, Stafford Senior High School, King George High School, and North Stafford High School) Students who are not based at a school with a CGS site are bused to a site for these core courses. However, they are considered students of their neighborhood high schools where they take their elective courses. Ultimately, students graduate from their "base" school with special recognition for completing the Governor's School program.

The curriculum is specifically integrated within core classes and involves tele-broadcasting technology between Commonwealth Governor's School sites.

Sylvia Wadsworth was the first director of the Commonwealth Governor's School, retiring from that position in 2005. Dr. David Baker took over the post after her departure. On May 19, 2010, Merri Kae VanderPloeg was named the new director until the 2018–2019 school year, where Jennifer Grigsby became the new director.

The Culminating Project
"Culminating" is a two-year-long research project with two phases, repeated twice over the CGS career. The first phase is the research phase (freshman and junior years). This requires the researcher to find sources, evaluate them, and arrange them in a final literature review (typically a 20+ page report summarizing all sources found during the research process). The second phase is the product phase (sophomore and senior years), where the researcher integrates the knowledge they learned from their research the previous year to create a project that solves a current problem or displays the depth of their research in full. Students are aided by assigned "advisors", consisting of CGS site faculty, each year.

References

External links
 

Public high schools in Virginia
Magnet schools in Virginia
Educational institutions established in 1998
Education in Stafford County, Virginia
Education in Spotsylvania County, Virginia
Education in King George County, Virginia
1998 establishments in Virginia